Chal Chal Re Naujawan  is a 1944 Indian Bollywood film. It was the seventh highest grossing Indian film of 1944.

References

External links
 

1944 films
1940s Hindi-language films
Indian black-and-white films
Films directed by Gyan Mukherjee
Saadat Hasan Manto